1988 presidential election may refer to:

 1988 Algerian presidential election
 1988 Cypriot presidential election
 1988 Finnish presidential election
 1988 French presidential election
 1988 Icelandic presidential election
 1988 Israeli presidential election
 1988 Maldivian presidential election
 1988 Mexican presidential election
 1988 Rwandan presidential election
 1988 Sri Lankan presidential election
 1988 United States presidential election
 1988 Venezuelan presidential election